Enneanectes jordani, known commonly as the redbelly triplefin and the mimic triplefin, is a species of triplefin blenny from the northern Caribbean Sea and the Gulf of Mexico south as far as Venezuela. The specific name honours the American ichthyologist David Starr Jordan (1851-1931). Some authorities consider the synonym Enneanectes pectoralis to be a valid species.

References

jordani
Fish described in 1899